Zaghej (also Romanized as Zāghej; also known as Zāgheh) is a village in Zarrineh Rud Rural District, Bizineh Rud District, Khodabandeh County, Zanjan Province, Iran. At the 2006 census, its population was 936, in 200 families.

References 

Populated places in Khodabandeh County